Row is a surname. Notable people by that name include:

 John Row, was a Scottish historian.
 John Row (poet) (born 1947), English storyteller.
 John Row (MP) for Totnes.
 Nicole Row, touring bassist for Panic! At the Disco.
 Robert Row (1915–1999), English fascist.
 William Row 17th century, Scottish minister and son-in-law of Robert Blair
 William Bickford Row (1786–1865), English-Canadian merchant, lawyer and politician